Siphonodentalium colubridens is a tusk shell or scaphopod in the family Gadilidae of the order Dentaliida. 

This species was described from only one specimen collected in 1874 by the H.M.S. Challenger expedition.  The original description and a drawing was published in 1879 by Robert Boog Watson, a Scottish malacologist who reported on the Scaphopoda and Gastropoda of the Challenger expedition.  The specimen was collected at a depth of about 1300 m in ocean waters east of North Island, New Zealand.

The species is described as having a smooth, white shell, with a swelling below the anterior aperture and  a length of 15 mm.

References

 Scarabino, V. (2008). New species and new records of scaphopods from New Caledonia. in: Héros, V. et al. (Ed.) Tropical Deep-Sea Benthos 25. Mémoires du Muséum national d'Histoire naturelle (1993). 196: 215-268
 Spencer, H.G., Marshall, B.A. & Willan, R.C. (2009). Checklist of New Zealand living Mollusca. Pp 196-219. in: Gordon, D.P. (ed.) New Zealand inventory of biodiversity. Volume one. Kingdom Animalia: Radiata, Lophotrochozoa, Deuterostomia. Canterbury University Press, Christchurch.

External links
  Watson, R.B. (1879). Mollusca of H.M.S. 'Challenger' Expedition. II. The Solenoconchia, comprising the genera Dentalium, Siphodentalium, and Cadulus. Journal of the Linnean Society (London). 14: 508-529

Scaphopods
Molluscs described in 1879